The International Islamic University, Islamabad, or IIUI, is a public research university located in Islamabad, Pakistan. It was established in 1980 and restructured in 1985, and remains a valuable source for Higher Education in Pakistan. The university is regularly listed among the most recognized universities and prestigious degree awarding institutions of Pakistan by the Higher Education Commission of Pakistan. The university ranks joint second in the 2022 top university rankings of Times Higher Education World University Rankings in Pakistan. It also constantly ranks among the best universities in the country for the general category by Higher Education Commission of Pakistan.

Overview
The university is a centre of Islam, theology and the Islamic studies in a contemporary context .

The university was founded in 1980 with funding from inside Pakistan and foreign donations from Saudi Arabia. The university provides education and training in Islamic law for the professions of judicial officers, public prosecutors, teachers of madrassas, preachers of Friday sermons and imams.

It attracts students domestically and from Central and Southeast Asia.

In 2012, the university was ranked fourth in general universities category by the Higher Education Commission (Pakistan). In February 2014, it awarded King Abdullah of Saudi Arabia an honorary doctorate in politics and international relations. It offers undergraduate and post-graduate programs in law, science, engineering & technology, humanities, arts, religious studies, social and natural sciences.

Campuses

The university has two campuses.

Old campus
The old campus lies about the Faisal Masjid. The masjid was designed by Vedat Dalokay, a Turkish architect. It was donated to the university by King Faisal of Saudi Arabia. The Masjid is one of the largest in the world and is able to accommodate tens of thousands of people in its prayer hall, women's gallery and courtyard.

New campus
The new campus occupies Islamabad's Sector H-10. The first phase of construction of the new campus was completed in 2013. Since then a campus area for women has been established. In 2006, the construction of the Central Library and the Lincoln Corner was completed.

Faculties
The university consists of the following faculties:

Faculty of Computings
The Faculty of Computing (founded in 2016) teaches computer science and software engineering

Faculty of Arabic
The Faculty of Arabic teaches Arabic Language, literature, Linguistics, Translation and Interpretation.

Faculty of Basic and Applied Sciences
The Faculty of Basic and Applied Sciences (founded in 2003) teaches computer science and software engineering, physics and nanotechnology, mathematics and statistics, environmental sciences, biotechnology and bioinformatics.

Faculty of Engineering and Technology
The Faculty of Engineering and Technology (founded in 2007) offers degrees in Electrical Engineering, Mechanical Engineering and Civil Engineering. It has a lot of foreign qualified faculty.

Iqra College of Technology
The Iqra College of Technology (ICT) is a constituent college of IIUI. It offers B.Tech (Hons) and Diploma of Associate Engineering (DAE) programs. It has faculty duly recognized by PEC

Faculty of Languages and Literature
The faculty of languages and literature offers BS, MS and PhD degrees in English, Persian and Urdu.

Faculty of Management Sciences
The faculty of management sciences was founded in 1995. In 1996, the Department of Business Administration offered Master of Business Administration program. The Department of Technology Management was founded in 1998. It is the largest faculty of the university with around 3,700 registered students.

Faculty of Shariah and Law 
The Faculty of Shariah and Law was first established in Quaid-i-Azam University in 1979. In 1980, it was incorporated into International Islamic University, Islamabad. Students enrolling in doctorate programs complete one year of compulsory coursework before commencing a thesis. More than 900 students have graduated from this faculty.

Faculty of Social Sciences
The Faculty of Social Sciences offers degrees in Anthropology, Education, Politics and International Relations, Psychology, History and Pakistan Studies, Islamic Art and Architecture, Mass Communications and Sociology.

Faculty of Islamic Studies
A Faculty of Islamic Studies (Usuluddin) was founded in 1981. It offers degrees in the Tafseer and Quranic sciences, Hadith, comparative religion, Da'wah and Islamic culture, Aqeedah and philosophy and Seerah and Islamic history. The Da'wah Academy was founded in March 1985. The Shari'ah Institute of Training was founded in 1981 and became an academy in 1985.

Faculty of Usuluddin have different international faculty members. Such as Al-Azhar University qualified professors.

Constituent Units

Centre of Excellence for Modern Languages
The Centre of Excellence for Modern Languages teaches English, Chinese and Urdu languages preparatory courses for students seeking to enroll in foreign and national universities (for example, HEC scholarships) or seeking employment. It also offers an English proficiency program.

International Institute of Islamic Economics 
The university's International Institute of Islamic Economics was founded in 1983. It offers degrees in Islamic banking and finance, econometric and rural development. Within the faculty, the Division of Research and Training promotes research and offers training for staff of public and private financial and academic institutions.

Islamic Research Institute

Iqbal International Institute for Research and Dialogue

Institute of Professional Studies

Shariah Academy

Libraries

Central library
The central library is situated on the new campus. There is also the Muhammad Hamidullah and the International Institute of Islamic Economics library. It contains rare books on Islamic law relating to economics and Islamic governance.

Islamic Research Institute library
The Islamic Research Institute library is a source of knowledge about Islam.

Engineering and technology library
The engineering and technology library contains 25,000 books. Fifteen periodicals are subscribed and ten newspapers are purchased. The library can seat fifty users. There are 550 research reports and theses.

Da'wah Academy library
DA’WAH ACADEMY LIBRARIES
Da’wah Academy has five types of libraries to fulfill the information needs of its research scholars, academicians, course participants, and the general public. These are Da’wah Research Library, Dr. Mehmood Ahmed Ghazi Library, Da’wah Centre for Women Library, Dawah Children Library Faisal Masjid Campus Islamabad and Regional Da’wah Centre (Sindh) Library, Karachi.

Shari'ah Academy Library
The Shariah Academy Library has a collection of 8,976 books and journals on the subjects of Qur'anic studies, Hadith studies, Prophet's Biography, Islamic law and Anglo-Saxon law. 
There are also a number of departmental libraries such as the Research Journals library, the Library of Islamic Studies, the Al-Dirassat Al-Islamyya, the Fikro Nazar, the Insights library and the Mayar library. The university publishes the Journal of Business and Management Sciences (JBMS).

Dr. Hamidullah Library
It is located in the basement of Faisal mosque and it has large volume of books on varieties of subjects.

Hostels
The university infrastructure includes seven academic buildings. The university's student accommodation includes seven hostels for women and six for men.

Research journals
 Islamic Studies 
 Al-Dirassat Al-Islamyya 
 Insights 
 Mayar 
 Islamabad Law Review 
 Fikr o Nazar 
 Journal of Business and Management Sciences

Foreign collaboration
The university has academic ties with:
 Al-Azhar University, Cairo, Egypt
 Umm al-Qura University, Makkah, Saudi Arabia
 Islamic University of Medina, Medina, Saudi Arabia
 King Abdulaziz University, Jeddah, Saudi Arabia
 Ningxia University, China
 International Islamic University Malaysia, Malaysia
 International Islamic University Chittagong, Bangladesh

Associations 
 Scientific Pakistan (www.scientificpakistan.com)
 IT Sarkar (www.itsarkar.com)
 Anjuman Talaba e Islam 
 Islami Jamiat Talaba
 Academic Staff Welfare Association 
 Officer Welfare Association 
 University Staff Welfare Association 
 American Society of Mechanical Engineers 
 National Academy of Young Scientists (NAYS), Pakistan (NAYS IIUI Chapter)

References

External links 
 IIUI official website
 Times Higher Education Rankings

 
Universities and colleges in Islamabad
Educational institutions established in 1980
1980 establishments in Pakistan
Islamic universities and colleges in Pakistan
Public universities and colleges in Pakistan
Salafi Islamic universities and colleges
Engineering universities and colleges in Pakistan
Islamabad Capital Territory
Salafism in Pakistan
Pakistan–Saudi Arabia relations